Trafford Council is the local authority of the Metropolitan Borough of Trafford in Greater Manchester, England. It is a metropolitan district council, one of ten in Greater Manchester and one of 36 in the metropolitan counties of England, and provides the majority of local government services in Trafford.

Parliamentary representation 
Trafford is currently covered by three constituencies: Altrincham and Sale West (nine wards), Stretford and Urmston (nine wards) and Wythenshawe and Sale East (three wards).

Wards and councillors 

Each ward is represented by three councillors.

Notes 

 The short name of Trafford Council is currently used by the authority for most purposes, however the longer names of Trafford Metropolitan Borough Council and Trafford Borough Council are commonly used in relation to the council.

 Delayed from 2020 due to the coronavirus pandemic.

References to Note 1
 The Local Authorities (Categorisation) (England) Order 2006, SI 2006/3096, art 5.
 

References to Note 2

References 

Metropolitan district councils of England
Local authorities in Greater Manchester
Leader and cabinet executives
Local education authorities in England
Billing authorities in England
1974 establishments in England
Council